Lieutenant-Colonel Sir Alan Hughes Burgoyne (30 September 1880 – 26 April 1929) was a British Conservative politician.

He first contested King's Lynn in 1906. He was MP for Kensington North from 1910 to 1922. He was knighted in 1922. He joined the short-lived National Party, but rejoined the Conservatives before the 1918 general election. He was then MP for Aylesbury from 1924 to 1929.

Burgoyne was the author of Submarine Navigation Past and Present, published in 1903, and of The War Inevitable, published in 1908. The latter is an example of invasion literature in which a German invasion of England is defeated by the Anglo-Japanese Alliance.

Sources
Whitaker's Almanack, 1907 to 1918 and 1925 to 1929 editions
Craig, F.W.S., British Parliamentary Election Results

External links
 
 

Conservative Party (UK) MPs for English constituencies
1880 births
1929 deaths
UK MPs 1910–1918
UK MPs 1918–1922
UK MPs 1924–1929
British Army personnel of World War I
Middlesex Regiment officers
King's Regiment (Liverpool) officers
Officiers of the Légion d'honneur
British military writers
Knights Bachelor
Fellows of the Royal Geographical Society
University of Montpellier alumni
Alumni of The Queen's College, Oxford